The Pic de Montferrat, culminating at , is a crest summit on the Franco-Spanish border, in the massif du Vignemale in the Pyrenees.

Topography 

It is located in the Hautes-Pyrénées department, between Cauterets and Gavarnie, arrondissement of Argelès-Gazost in the Pyrenees National Park. It is bordered to the north by the glacier d'Ossoue and by le petit glacier du Montferrat to the south-east.

History 
The first ascension was carried out by shepherds, on August 1, 1792, who built a turret on the summit, ordered by Louis-Philippe Reinhart Junker who led a team of geodesists in charge of defining the Franco-Spanish border path.

See also 
 List of Pyrenean three-thousanders

References

Mountains of the Pyrenees
Mountains of Hautes-Pyrénées
Pyrenean three-thousanders